The 1982 Taipei International Championships was a men's tennis tournament played on indoor carpet courts in Taipei, Taiwan that was part of the 1982 Volvo Grand Prix. It was the sixth edition of the tournament and was held from 8 November through 14 November 1982. Unseeded Brad Gilbert won the singles title.

Finals

Singles
 Brad Gilbert defeated  Craig Wittus 6–1, 6–4
 It was Gilbert's first singles title of his career.

Doubles
 Robert Van't Hof /  Larry Stefanki defeated  Fred McNair /  Tim Wilkison 6–3, 7–6

References

External links
 ITF tournament edition details

Taipei Summit Open